The 1973 Torneo Descentralizado was the 57th season of the Peruvian Primera División and the ninth season of the Torneo Descentralizado. It was won for the first time by Defensor Lima. Sportivo Huracán, Atlético Torino, José Gálvez, and SIMA were relegated.

Competition modus
Eighteen teams competed against each other at home and away for a total of 34 rounds. At the end of the 34th round, four teams were relegated and the top six teams in the league table played an additional 5 rounds against each other at a neutral venue which was the Estadio Nacional. Once these 5 rounds concluded, the champions and runners-up qualified to the 1974 Copa Libertadores.

Teams

League table

Final group

References

External links
Peru 1973 season at RSSSF
Peruvian Football League News 

Peruvian Primera División seasons
Peru
Primera Division Peruana